Joseph Sunday Ajomo (born 11 Jun, 1939 in Ogori, Nigeria) was a Nigerian clergyman and bishop for the Roman Catholic Diocese of Lokoja. He became ordained in 1962. He was appointed bishop in 1992. He died in 2004.

References

20th-century Roman Catholic bishops in Nigeria
1939 births
2004 deaths
21st-century Roman Catholic bishops in Nigeria
Roman Catholic bishops of Lokoja